The Zhengzhou–Fuyang high-speed railway is a high-speed passenger-dedicated railway between Zhengzhou in Henan province, and Fuyang in Anhui province on China's central plain. It opened on 1 December 2019.

List of stations
 
 
 
 
 
 
 
 
 
 
 Fuyang West

Description
In December 2019, there were 9 trains per day in each direction along the line, the fastest time between the terminals is now 1 hour 22 minutes (train G1955) the slowest direct train on the line takes 1 hour and 55 minutes (train G3182). There are alternative high-speed trains between the terminals via  which are almost as fast, for example G3170 takes 2 hours and 2 minutes.

References

High-speed railway lines in China
Rail transport in Henan
Rail transport in Anhui
Railway lines opened in 2019